Omar Milanetto (born 30 November 1975 in Venaria Reale) is an Italian former footballer, who last played for Serie B side Padova as a midfielder as of 2012. A physical, experienced, hard-working, and tactically intelligent player, Milanetto was usually deployed as a defensive or central midfielder, where he was also capable of operating as a deep-lying playmaker. In addition to his creativity, strength, playmaking skills, and his ability to control the tempo of his team's play, he was also known for his accuracy from set-pieces, penalties, and shots from distance.

Career
Milanetto began his career with Juventus in 1993; although he did not make a single appearance for the senior side during the 1993–94 season, he won the 1994 Torneo di Viareggio and the Campionato Nazionale Primavera with the Juventus Youth side. He later played for several different clubs during the following seasons, including Fiorenzuola, Monza (on loan), and Como. In 2000, he joined Serie C1/A side Modena, and helped the club to achieve successive promotions, eventually making his Serie A debut during the 2002–03 season. Following the retirement of Roberto Baggio in 2004, he joined Serie A club Brescia, where he was re-united with his former Modena coach Gianni De Biasi, although he was unable to save the club from relegation during his first season, spending his second season with the club in Serie B. In 2006, he transferred to Serie B side Genoa, where he remained for five seasons, helping the club to Serie A promotion.

On 26 July 2011, after initially being linked with Lugano, it was announced that Milanetto had joined Padova, after a furious row with the Genoa supporters. The midfielder had been a very popular figure with the fans, but his rapport with the club's ultras was damaged when he hurled an insult at the Gradinata Nord during the Derby della Lanterna against Sampdoria, after providing the winning assist to Mauro Boselli.

Match-fixing and retirement
On 28 May 2012, Milanetto was arrested by Italian police for his alleged involvement in the Calcioscommesse sports betting scandal. He subsequently cancelled his contract with Padova, retiring from football in August 2012; he later took up a position as a scout for his former club, Genoa, in October 2013.

Honours

Club
Juventus Primavera
 Torneo di Viareggio: 1994
 Campionato Nazionale Primavera: 1993–94

References

External links
 Official website
 Career statistics

1975 births
Living people
People from Venaria Reale
Italian footballers
Association football midfielders
Serie A players
Serie B players
Juventus F.C. players
A.C. Monza players
Modena F.C. players
Como 1907 players
Brescia Calcio players
Genoa C.F.C. players
Calcio Padova players
Footballers from Piedmont
Sportspeople from the Metropolitan City of Turin